Branko Klenkovski (25 September 1946 – 12 July 2013) was a former Yugoslav footballer.

References

1946 births
2013 deaths
Yugoslav footballers
Red Star Belgrade footballers
FK Proleter Zrenjanin players
Yugoslav First League players
Association football defenders